Çamlıca is a village in the Keşan District of Edirne Province in Turkey. Before the 2013 reorganisation, it was a town (belde).

References

Villages in Keşan District